The Bachubhai Maganbhai Khabad is an Indian politician. He was elected to the Gujarat Legislative Assembly from Devgadhbariya in the 2002, 2012, 2017 and 2022 Gujarat Legislative Assembly election as a member of the Bharatiya Janata Party. He was sworn as Minister of State for Fisheries, Forest and Environment in Anandiben Patel cabinet in 2014. Khabad belongs to the Koli caste of Gujarat.

References 

Living people
State cabinet ministers of Gujarat
People from Dahod district
1955 births
Bharatiya Janata Party politicians from Gujarat
Gujarat MLAs 2012–2017
Gujarat MLAs 2017–2022